Inspection in  manufacturing is conducting inspection during the production process. This approach of inspection helps to control the quality of products by helping to fix the sources of defects immediately after they are detected, and it is useful for any factory that wants to improve productivity, reduce defect rates, and reduce re-work and waste.

Positive impact
Reduces end-line defects
Saves time and efforts of final inspection
Helps to fix the problems at the outset, and prevents common mistakes being made repeatedly
Helps to ensure quality of the products of a production line

See also
 Quality control
 Good manufacturing practice

References 
Daizhong Su, Qingbin Zhang and Shifan Zhu. (2009). In-line inspection.

Industrial engineering